Algoa Correctional Center (ACC) is a minimum security prison in Jefferson City, Missouri operated by the Missouri Department of Corrections. It houses approximately 1600 inmates, with a staff of approximately 470. It is located at 8501 No More Victims Road, Jefferson City, MO 65101.

Algoa Correctional Center is the only male institution in the state of Missouri that offers the IFI Program. The IFI program is also in the Women's Eastern Reception, Diagnostic and Correctional Center.

Notable inmates
Bobby Bostic, transferred from Jefferson City Correctional Center in 2021 to serve the final year of his sentence.

References 

Prisons in Missouri
1932 establishments in Missouri
Buildings and structures in Cole County, Missouri